Events in the year 1623 in Norway.

Incumbents
Monarch: Christian IV

Events

July - Discovery of silver in Buskerud. Led to the founding of Kongsberg and the Kongsberg Silver Mines in 1624.

Arts and literature

Births

Deaths

See also

References